The 1980 USAC Mini Indy Series season was the fourth and final season of the USAC sanctioned Formula Super Vee championship. All rounds were sanctioned by the USAC and a part of the 1980 SCCA Formula Super Vee season.

Race calendar and results

Teams and drivers

Final standings

References

Indy Lights seasons
1980 in American motorsport